Daily Dose of Sunshine is an upcoming South Korean streaming television series directed by Lee Jae-gyu, and starring Park Bo-young, Yeon Woo-jin, Jang Dong-yoon, and Lee Jung-eun. Based on the Kakao webtoon of the same name by Lee Ra-ha, it revolves around Jung Da-eun, a nurse of the Department of Psychiatry and the patients she meets. It is scheduled to be released on Netflix in the fourth quarter of 2023.

Cast

Main 
 Park Bo-young as Jung Da-eun, a nurse who gets transferred from Internal Medicine to the Psychiatric Department
 Yeon Woo-jin as Dong Go-geun, a proctologist with an erratic personality
 Jang Dong-yoon as  Song Yoo-chan, Da-eun's best friend who always quarrels with her
 Lee Jung-eun as Song Hyo-shin, the chief nurse of the Psychiatric Department

Supporting 
 Lee Sang-hee 
 Yoo In-soo
 Gong Sung-ha
 Im Jae-hyuk

References

External links
 
 
 

Upcoming Netflix original programming
Korean-language Netflix original programming
2023 South Korean television series debuts
2023 web series debuts
South Korean web series
South Korean drama web series
Television shows based on South Korean webtoons
Television series by Kim Jong-hak Production